Ang Babaeng Walang Pakiramdam is a 2021 Philippine comedy film written and directed by Darryl Yap. It starring Kim Molina as the title role. It premiered on June 11, 2021, through Viva Entertainment's online streaming platform Vivamax.

Plot
A woman diagnosed with a rare congenital disease that makes her incapable of feeling physical and emotional pain meets a man with cleft palate who makes her feel love like she never has before.

Cast
 Kim Molina as Anastacia Quingquing
 Jerald Napoles as Ngongo
 Candy Pangilinan as Tindera
 Chad Kinis as Eric
 Petite as Au
 Tetchie Agbayani as Anastacia's mother
 Cai Cortez as Dra. Bueno
 Billy Jake Cortez as Boss
 Jade Gutierrez as Nita
 Jeanie Lisa Tan as Kambal na Tiyahin
 Jeanie Faye Tan-Paronda as Kambal na Tiyahin
 Aileen Cuevas as Nanay

Reception
Mario Dumaual of ABS-CBN News describes the film as "a comedic milestone for the Molina and Napoles", stating that they both "have perfect chemistry and comedic timing" in several hilarious scenes. He also praises Kim for portraying an indifferent character despite the struggles and Jerald for eclipsing Kim's character in parts of the movie.

References

External links

2021 films
Viva Films films
Philippine comedy films